The Momphidae, or mompha moths, is a family of moths with some 115 described species. It was described by Gottlieb August Wilhelm Herrich-Schäffer in 1857. These moths tend to be rather small with a wingspan of up to 21 mm. The wings are held folded over the body at rest. The larvae are concealed feeders, either as leaf miners or within seeds or stems.

Genera

Anchimompha Clarke, 1965
Batrachedrodes Zimmerman, 1978
Desertidacna Sinev, 1988
Gracilosia Sinev, 1989
Inflataria Sinev, 1989
Licmocera Walsingham, 1891
Mompha Hübner, [1825]
subgenus Anybia
subgenus Cyphophora
subgenus Lophoptilus
subgenus Psacaphora
Moriloma Busck, 1912
Palaeomystella T. B. Fletcher, 1940
Patanotis Meyrick, 1913
Phalaritica Meyrick, 1913
Semeteria Sinev, 1989
Synallagma Engel, 1907
Zapyrastra Meyrick, 1889

Former genera
Batrachedropsis (synonym of Coccidiphila in Cosmopterigidae)
Bifascia (now in Cosmopterigidae)
Coccidiphila (now in Cosmopterigidae)
Isorrhoa (now in Cosmopterigidae)
Lacciferophaga
Laverna
Lienigia
Tenuipenna (synonym of Pyroderces in Cosmopterigidae)
Urodeta (now in Elachistidae)

References

 
Moth families
Gelechioidea